Abdou Sall (born 1 November 1980) is a Senegalese former professional footballer who played as a centre-back.

Career
Born in Dakar, Senegal, Sall moved to France at the age of four with his father where he grew up in Toulouse. He played for Forest Green Rovers of the Conference National in the 2005–06 season. having joined in summer 2005 from League Two team Kidderminster Harriers on a free transfer.

He previously spent time with Oxford United and Nuneaton Borough.

Sall played in Germany with 2. Bundesliga side FC St. Pauli until 2008 but was kept out of action through injury for most of his time there.

References

External links
 
 
 

1980 births
Living people
Senegalese footballers
Association football central defenders
Montauban FCTG players
Kidderminster Harriers F.C. players
Oxford United F.C. players
Nuneaton Borough F.C. players
Forest Green Rovers F.C. players
FC St. Pauli players
FC St. Pauli II players
Altonaer FC von 1893 players
Senegalese expatriate footballers
Senegalese expatriate sportspeople in England
Expatriate footballers in England
Senegalese expatriate sportspeople in Germany
Expatriate footballers in Germany